"Call Me" is a song by Italian produced Deejay Jay featuring Swedish singer Pandora. The song was released on 2 July 2008 and peaked at number 5 on the Swedish charts.

Deejay Jay and Pandora promoted the track on a European tour in summer 2008.

Track listing
CD single / Digital download
 "Call Me" (Radio Edit)	- 3:16
 "Call Me" (Extended Radio) - 5:03
 "Call Me" (V & M Club Edit) - 3:11
 "Call Me" (V & M Club Extended Edit) - 5:38

Chart performance

Weekly charts

Year-end charts

References

2008 singles
2008 songs
English-language Swedish songs
Pandora (singer) songs
Songs written by Larry Pignagnoli
Songs written by Giorgio Spagna